Bob Brynildson is an American retailer. He is the owner of The Source Comics and Games in Saint Paul, Minnesota, United States.

Career
Jerry Corrick and Bob Brynildson were the owners of The Source Comics & Games – a Twin Cities game store. When Atlas Games did not have the finances to publish On the Edge (1994), they partnered with Corrick and Brynildson and formed a new corporation called Trident, Inc. to publish the game.  Eventually Atlas would be subsumed into Trident; Brynildson, Corrick, and The Source continued to support Atlas with their business experience and perspective.

References

Businesspeople from Saint Paul, Minnesota
Comics retailers
Living people
Place of birth missing (living people)
Year of birth missing (living people)